Sangaria railway station is a railway station in Hanumangarh district, Rajasthan. Its code is SGRA. It serves Sangaria town. The station consists of a single platform. Passenger, Express, and Superfast trains halt here.

Trains

The following trains halt at Sangaria railway station in both directions:

 Ahmedabad–Jammu Tawi Express
 Avadh Assam Express
 Kalka–Barmer Express
 Hazur Sahib Nanded–Shri Ganganagar Express

References

Railway stations in Hanumangarh district
Bikaner railway division